"One of a Kind" is a song by South Korean rapper G-Dragon.  Released on August 24, 2012 through YG Entertainment, it served as the lead single from the extended play of the same name.  Written solely by G-Dragon, the rapper also worked with long-time collaborator Choice37 to produce the music. The song was well received by music critics, that considered it one of his best work and one of the most influential Korean hip hop tracks. "One of a Kind" peaked at number nine on the Gaon Digital Chart in South Korea.

Composition and reception 
A hip hop and pop-rap song, the lyrics discuss "cheeky" themes such as money and fame. David Jeffries of Allmusic deemed the track as "a bright, boastful number with a hooky chorus and plenty of exciting production tricks". Billboard named "One of a Kind" the seventeenth best K-pop song of 2012, praising the "knocking hip-hop beat that today's biggest rappers would kill for" and how G-Dragon "showed off his impressive knack for flow and lyrics". Web portal Daum named the single the fifth best Korean song of the year, calling it a "masterpiece" and its composition "outstanding".

Korean music critic Kim Bong-hyun included "One of a Kind" in his book of most influential Korean hip hop songs from 1989 to 2016, naming it one of the 28 tracks that shaped the genre. "One of a Kind" was also the only song by a solo artist to be included in The Dong-a Ilbos 2016 list of the best male idol songs in the past 20 years. Ize magazine listed "One of a Kind" as one of the most memorable songs written by G-Dragon, commenting that it raised his status as a hip-hop musician.

Commercially, the song became the fifth track from the album to peak within Gaon Digital Chart's top ten, when it rose to number nine in its second week, after a debut at number 21. The track earned him the Best Hip Hop / Rap Song of the Year awards from the Korean Music Awards and the Rhythmer Awards.

Music video
The music video for "One of a Kind" preceded the album, being released on YouTube on August 25, 2012, marking his first solo release since Heartbreaker (2009). Directed by Seo Hyun Seung, the video was described as "autobiographical" and "glittered with designer items." G-Dragon is seen wearing outfits that he has worn in previous music videos. Fellow Big Bang member, Taeyang makes an appearance. David Bevan of Spin called it "a dazzling clip" for the "undeniable pop-rap juggernaut" track. Stereogum named "One of a Kind" the best music video of the week, with Tom Breihan commenting that "[I]f you don’t have a baby tiger on a leash or a dancing bear cub in your video, you lost. Sometimes, it’s just that simple. K-pop has discovered skate-rap, and we should all be very, very excited about that." Fuse called it one of G-Dragon's "must-see videos", noting that the "Explicit Content" reinterpreted sticker is "one of his most memorable looks".

Chart performance and sales

Sales

Awards

References 

2012 songs
2012 singles
YG Entertainment singles
Korean-language songs
G-Dragon songs
Songs written by G-Dragon